Harold Crawford may refer to:

Harold Crawford (footballer), see Hugh McDonald (footballer)
Harold Crawford (architect), see Viola Cooperative Creamery

See also
Harry Crawford (disambiguation)